Lee Sung-yol is a South Korean television drama director who directed such hits as Jealousy (질투, 1992), Kukhee (국희, 1999) and Save the Last Dance for Me (2004).

References

South Korean television directors
Year of birth missing (living people)
Living people
Seoul National University alumni